The South Korea-Peru Free Trade Agreement is signed between the governments of Korea and Peru on March 21, 2011, in Seoul, Korea. On July 6, 2011, the Korean Parliament passed a bill ratifying the agreement concluding the process of establishing the second FTA between Korea and a South American country. The FTA did not need to be ratified by the Peruvian parliament.

History 

In the 2005 APEC  meeting held in Busan, Peru proposed Korea the establishment of an FTA between the two nations. In November 2006, the two countries agreed on forming a study group to develop the potential FTA. The study started in October 2007 in Lima and concluded spring 2008 in Seoul. Throughout 2009, four negotiation meetings were held in both Lima and Seoul and the announcement on the conclusion of the negotiations was on August 30, 2010. The FTA would eventually be signed in 2011.

Main Aspects 

The goal of the FTA is to eliminate most tariffs over ten years with the exception of 107 agricultural and marine products such as rice, beef, onion and garlic. For Korea, the automotive, electronic and appliances industries will enjoy most of the benefits. For the Peruvian side, the main exports are copper, zinc, lead, iron and concentrates besides molluscs, frozen squid, fish meal, coffee and textiles. According to the Peruvian ministry of commerce, the FTA is formed by the next aspects:

 National treatment and access to markets
 Origin rules and procedures
 Trade Defense
 Technical obstacles for trade
 Hygiene measures
 Customs and easement of trade
 Trade of services
 Telecommunications
 Temporary entry for business persons
 Financial services
 Investment Inversión
 Electronic trade
 Intellectual property
 Competition policies
 Public Purchases
 Cooperation and strengthening of trade capacities
 Labour
 Environment
 Controversies settlements
 Institutional issues

Double Taxing Agreement 

On July 8, 2011, the two countries signed an agreement to avoid double taxing, which also aims to persecute tax evasion. With the agreement, tax deductions will go up to 10 percent over the dividends in the country they were generated and interests go up to 15 percent. The Korean government aims to ease the activities of Korean companies entering the mining sector in the resource rich South American country.

References

Free trade agreements of Peru
Free trade agreements of South Korea
Treaties of South Korea
Treaties concluded in 2011
Treaties entered into force in 2011
Treaties of Peru